Carlos Samuel Moreno Terán (born 4 November 1962) is a Mexican politician from the Ecologist Green Party of Mexico. From 2009 to 2012 he served as Deputy of the LXI Legislature of the Mexican Congress representing Sonora, and previously served as a local deputy in the LVII Legislature of the Congress of Sonora.

References

1962 births
Living people
Politicians from Sonora
People from Cananea
Members of the Congress of Sonora
Ecologist Green Party of Mexico politicians
21st-century Mexican politicians
Universidad de Sonora alumni
Deputies of the LXI Legislature of Mexico
Members of the Chamber of Deputies (Mexico) for Sonora